Tigran Hamasyan (born July 17, 1987) is an Armenian jazz pianist and composer. He plays mostly original compositions, which are strongly influenced by the Armenian folk tradition, often using its scales and modalities. In addition to this folk influence, Hamasyan is influenced by American jazz traditions and to some extent, as on his album Red Hail, by progressive rock. His solo album A Fable is most strongly influenced by Armenian folk music. Even on his most overt jazz compositions and renditions of well-known jazz pieces, his improvisations often contain embellishments based on scales from Middle Eastern/Southwest Asian traditions.

Early life
Hamasyan was born in Gyumri, Armenia. His ancestors were from the Kars region. His father was a jeweler and his mother designed clothes. At the age of three he began to play melodies on his family's piano, and he went to a music school from the age of six. As a young child, he dreamed of being a thrash metal guitarist.

He studied jazz from the age of nine, then tried to incorporate local folk melodies into jazz-form improvisations when in his teens. At this stage, Hamasyan was influenced by Armenian composers Arno Babajanian and Avet Terterian. Hamasyan, together with his parents and sister, moved to Yerevan when he was around 10, and then to California when he was 16. He currently resides in Yerevan, Armenia.

Career

Hamasyan recorded his first album, World Passion, at the age of 18. He spent a lot of 2013 in Armenia, which helped develop his interest in its folk music. He was the leader of the "Aratta Rebirth", with which he performed Red Hail. On April 29, 2022, Nonesuch Records released Hamasyan’s first album of American standards - StandArt. The project was recorded in the spring of 2021 in Los Angeles and includes 9 songs from the 1920s through the 1950s, by Richard Rodgers, Charlie Parker, Jerome Kern, David Raksin, and others. Bassist Matt Brewer, drummer Justin Brown, trumpeter Ambrose Akinmusire, saxophonist and label-mate Joshua Redman, and saxophonist Mark Turner collaborated with the pianist and contributed to the recording.

Awards 
 2002: 3rd Prize Concours International de Piano-Jazz Martial Solal (Paris).
 2003: 1st Prize Jazz à Juan Révélations in the jazz instrumental category.
 2003: 1st Prize Prix de la Critique et du Public, Concours de Piano du Montreux Jazz Festival.
 2005: 3rd Prize Concours de Piano-Jazz de Moscou.
 2005: 1st Prize 8ème Concours de Solistes de Jazz de Monaco.
 2006: 1st Prize Thelonious Monk Institute of Jazz.
 2006: 2nd Prize Concours International de Piano-Jazz Martial Solal.
 2013: Vilcek Prize for Creative Promise in Contemporary Music
 2015: Paul Acket Award in the North Sea Jazz Festival.
 2016: ECHO Jazz Awards.

 Sheet music

In Spring 2018 Tigran Hamasyan made his first official sheet music release via Terentyev Music Publishing Company. The edition was released digitally and contains 3 pieces for solo piano: "Etude No.1", “Markos and Markos”, and “Lilac”.

 Discography 
Albums
As lead artist

EPs
 EP No. 1 (2011) Released exclusively on vinyl and digital download
 The Poet - EP (2014)
 For Gyumri (2018)

Collaborations
2010: Abu Nawas Rhapsody with Dhafer Youssef (Jazzland Records) 
2011: Lines Of Oppression with Ari Hoenig (Naive/AH-HA)
2012: Liberetto with Lars Danielsson (The Act Company) 
2012: Lobi with Stéphane Galland (Out There / Out Note)
2013: Jazz-Iz-Christ with Serj Tankian, Valeri Tolstov & Tom Duprey
2013: The World Begins Today with Olivier Bogé, Sam Minaie & Jeff Ballard (Naïve Jazz)
2014: Liberetto II with Lars Danielsson (The Act Company) 
2015: Ancient Mechanisms with LV (Brownswood Recordings)
2016: Atmosphères'' with Arve Henriksen, Eivind Aarset, and Jan Bang (ECM)

References

External links  
 Tigran Hamasyan - Armenian National Music
 
 

Armenian jazz pianists
21st-century pianists
21st-century Armenian musicians
ECM Records artists
Nonesuch Records artists
Verve Records artists
1987 births
Living people
People from Gyumri
Tchaikovsky Secondary Music School alumni
Armenian expatriates in the United States